Brisbane Water is a wave-dominated barrier estuary located in the Central Coast region, north of Sydney, New South Wales, Australia. A number of towns and suburbs surround the shores of Brisbane Water, including Blackwall, Booker Bay, Davistown, Empire Bay, Erina, Ettalong Beach, Gosford, Green Point, Hardys Bay, Kilcare, Kincumber, Koolewong, Phegans Bay, Point Frederick, Point Clare , Saratoga, Tascott, Wagstaffe, and Woy Woy. Contained within Brisbane Water is St Huberts Island, Rileys Island, Dunmar Island and Pelican Island; and adjoining the estuary is Brisbane Water National Park to the west and Bouddi National Park to the east. Forming part of the same tidal estuary system is a separate but connected basin, the Kincumber Broadwater, lying to the east of Davistown.

The land adjacent to the Brisbane Water was occupied for many thousands of years by Australian Aboriginal peoples, the Darkinjung and Kuringgai, who used the estuary and foreshore areas for cultural purposes.

Brisbane Water was named in 1825 in honour of Sir Thomas Brisbane, a Governor of New South Wales, serving between 1820 and 1825.

History 
Brisbane Water is part of the traditional lands of the Darkinjung and Kuringgai aboriginal peoples. Places of significance to Aboriginal people located in the area surrounding Brisbane Water that are listed on the Register of the National Estate include Daleys Point area and Staples Lookout, west of Woy Woy. Initial colonial explorers of the area were assisted by Bungaree, a leader of the Kuringgai tribe who went on to assist Phillip Parker King and Matthew Flinders in the circumnavigation of Australia.

Twentieth century European settlement led to the development of an extensive local ferry network, including one supplying an otherwise isolated orphanage, a commuter service from Gosford to Woy Woy and a third operation dedicated to carrying farm produce. The last commuter ferries between Brisbane Water townships ceased in 1971. The only ferry service to exist now services the communities of Empire Bay, Davistown, Saratoga and Woy Woy and is operated by Central Coast Ferries.

In 1973, local residents on Rileys Island requested a green ban after a development company intended to remove all native vegetation to make way for construction on the island.

Environment
The Brisbane Water estuary and foreshores have particularly high scenic value and include areas of pristine vegetation and extensive views of the water from a number of locations. Beaches, inlets and bays can be distinguished in the foreground with inherent juxtaposition of bushland-covered hills in the distance. Access to existing key vantage points allows for the public to experience the landscape character of the Brisbane Water estuary and its surrounds.

The inlet narrows at a point known as The Rip, located adjacent to Ettalong Beach. The Rip has a rapid tidal current.

The oyster industry is an important part of the local economy.  In terms of Sydney rock oyster production, in 2007–2008 a total of ~250,000 dozens of oysters were produced in the Brisbane Water estuary, with a total value of A$1.3 million representing approximately 3.6% of the NSW industry total for 2007–2008.

During 2009, over 110 bird species were recorded within the estuary; with sixty vulnerable and fourteen endangered animal species, and sixteen vulnerable and eight endangered plant species. Some  of Brisbane Water is classified by BirdLife International as an important bird area because it has an isolated population of up to ten breeding pairs of bush stone-curlews and sometimes supports flocks of the endangered regent honeyeater and swift parrot during autumn and winter, when the swamp mahogany trees are in flower.

References

External links

 
 

Central Coast (New South Wales)
Bays of New South Wales
Important Bird Areas of New South Wales
Main North railway line, New South Wales
Green bans